The 58th District of the Iowa House of Representatives in the state of Iowa.

Current elected officials
Steve Bradley is the representative currently representing the district.

Past representatives
The district has previously been represented by:
 Norman G. Jesse, 1971–1973
 Glen E. Bortell, 1973–1977
 Philip A. Davitt, 1977–1983
 Mike Van Camp, 1983–1989
 Jim Lykam, 1989–1991
 Steven Grubbs, 1991–1993
 Dennis Black, 1993–1995
 Danny Carroll, 1995–2003
 Clel Baudler, 2003–2013
 Brian Moore, 2013–2017
 Andy McKean, 2017–2021
 Steve Bradley, 2021–present

References

058